Merab Dvalishvili (born January 10, 1991) is a Georgian professional mixed martial artist. He currently competes in the Bantamweight division in the Ultimate Fighting Championship (UFC). As of March 13, 2023, he is #1 in the UFC bantamweight rankings.

Background
Dvalishvili grew up in Tbilisi, Georgia. He started training in qartuli chidaoba (traditional wrestling) and khridoli (transitional fighting), Sambo and judo when he was young for self-defense and moved to the United States when he was 21 years old to become a professional MMA fighter. He trains under Ray Longo and Matt Serra.

Mixed martial arts career

Early career
Dvalishvili started his MMA career in 2014 and fought under various promotions namely the Ring of Combat. He amassed a record of 7–2 prior to competing in the UFC.

Ultimate Fighting Championship 
Dvalishvili made his UFC debut on December 9, 2017, against Frankie Saenz at UFC Fight Night: Swanson vs. Ortega. He lost the fight via split decision.

His next fight came on April 21, 2018, at UFC Fight Night: Barboza vs. Lee against Ricky Simón. He lost the fight via technical submission at the final bell. This fight earned him the Fight of the Night award. Dvalishvili's team appealed the result on the grounds that he was not unconscious at the end of the round, but the appeal was denied.

Dvalishvili faced Terrion Ware on September 15, 2018, at UFC Fight Night: Hunt vs. Oleinik. He won the fight via unanimous decision.

Dvalishvili faced Brad Katona on May 4, 2019, at UFC Fight Night: Iaquinta vs. Cowboy. He won the fight via unanimous decision.

Dvalishvili faced Casey Kenney on February 15, 2020, at UFC Fight Night 167. He won the fight by unanimous decision.

Dvalishvili was scheduled to face Ray Borg on June 13, 2020, at UFC on ESPN: Eye vs. Calvillo. However, on June 11, 2020, it was reported that Borg withdrew from the bout and he was replaced by promotional newcomer Gustavo Lopez in a catchweight bout of 140 pounds. Dvalishvili was victorious via unanimous decision.

Dvalishvili faced John Dodson on August 15, 2020, at UFC 252. He won the fight via unanimous decision.

Dvalishvili was expected to face Cody Stamann on December 5, 2020, at UFC on ESPN 19. However on October 22, it was announced that Stamann pulled out due to undisclosed reasons, and he was replaced by Raoni Barcelos.  However, Barcelos was removed from the contest due to a medical suspension related to his latest bout on November 7. The bout between Dvalishvili and Stamann was reschedule for UFC Fight Night 184 on February 6, 2021.  In turn, in mid January, Dvalishvili was forced to pull out from the bout due to the struggle of the after-effects of a COVID-19 complication, and he was replaced by Andre Ewell. After a positive test for COVID-19, Ewell was pulled from the event and replaced by promotional newcomer Askar Askar, with the contest expected to take place at featherweight. On the day of the event, Askar was not medically cleared and the bout was cancelled. The bout between Dvalishvili and Stamann was re-scheduled again to May 1, 2021, at UFC on ESPN: Reyes vs. Procházka. Dvalishvili won the bout via unanimous decision.

Dvalishvili faced Marlon Moraes on September 25, 2021, at UFC 266. After being knocked down and nearly finished in the first round, Dvalishvili rallied and won the fight via TKO in round two.  This win earned him the Performance of the Night award.

Dvalishvili faced former UFC Featherweight champion José Aldo on August 20, 2022, at UFC 278. He won the bout via unanimous decision.

Dvalishvili faced Petr Yan on March 11, 2023 at UFC Fight Night: Yan vs. Dvalishvili. He won the fight via unanimous decision. Dvalishvili broke the UFC record for most takedowns attempted in a bout in UFC history with 49 attempts.

Professional grappling career

In 2019, Dvalishvili finished second in the Sambo World Championships in South Korea. Dvalishvili competed in combat sambo at 68 kilograms and lost in the finals to Russia's Stepan Kobenov.

Dvalishvili fought in the main event of Fury Pro Grappling 2 on October 29, 2021, and lost a unanimous decision to Kevin Dantzler.

Dvalishvili was booked to compete against Darren Branch in the main event of High Rollerz 23 on January 21, 2023. He won the match by submission, with a choke from kesa-gatame.

Championships and accomplishments
Ultimate Fighting Championship
Performance of the Night (One time) 
Fight of the Night (One time) 
Most unanimous decision wins in UFC Bantamweight division history (7)
Tied (Aljamain Sterling) for the longest win streak in UFC Bantamweight division history (8)
Most takedowns landed in UFC Bantamweight division history (61)
Most significant strikes landed in UFC Bantamweight division history (1569)
Tied (Demetrious Johnson) for fourth most takedowns landed in UFC history (74)
Most takedowns attempted in a bout in UFC history (49 vs Petr Yan) 
Ring of Combat
ROC Bantamweight Championship (One Time)
One successful title defense

Mixed martial arts record

|-
|Win
|align=center|16–4
|Petr Yan
|Decision (unanimous)
|UFC Fight Night: Yan vs. Dvalishvili
|
|align=center|5
|align=center|5:00
|Las Vegas, Nevada, United States
|
|-
|Win
|align=center|15–4
|José Aldo
|Decision (unanimous)
|UFC 278
|
|align=center|3
|align=center|5:00
|Salt Lake City, Utah, United States
|
|-
|Win
|align=center|14–4
|Marlon Moraes
|TKO (punches)
|UFC 266 
|
|align=center|2
|align=center|4:25
|Las Vegas, Nevada, United States
|
|-
|Win
|align=center|13–4
|Cody Stamann
|Decision (unanimous)
|UFC on ESPN: Reyes vs. Procházka 
|
|align=center|3
|align=center|5:00
|Las Vegas, Nevada, United States
|
|-
|Win
|align=center|12–4
|John Dodson
|Decision (unanimous)
|UFC 252
|
|align=center|3
|align=center|5:00
|Las Vegas, Nevada, United States
|
|-
|Win
|align=center|11–4
|Gustavo Lopez
|Decision (unanimous)
|UFC on ESPN: Eye vs. Calvillo
|
|align=center|3
|align=center|5:00
|Las Vegas, Nevada, United States
|
|-
|Win
|align=center|10–4
|Casey Kenney
|Decision (unanimous)
|UFC Fight Night: Anderson vs. Błachowicz 2 
|
|align=center|3
|align=center|5:00
|Rio Rancho, New Mexico, United States
|
|-
|Win
|align=center|9–4
|Brad Katona
|Decision (unanimous)
|UFC Fight Night: Iaquinta vs. Cowboy 
|
|align=center|3
|align=center|5:00
|Ottawa, Ontario, Canada
|
|-
|Win
|align=center|8–4
|Terrion Ware
|Decision (unanimous)
|UFC Fight Night: Hunt vs. Oleinik
|
|align=center|3
|align=center|5:00
|Moscow, Russia
|
|-
|Loss
|align=center|7–4
|Ricky Simón
|Technical Submission (guillotine choke)
|UFC Fight Night: Barboza vs. Lee
|
|align=center|3
|align=center|5:00
|Atlantic City, New Jersey, United States
|
|-
|Loss
|align=center|7–3
|Frankie Saenz
|Decision (split)
|UFC Fight Night: Swanson vs. Ortega
|
|align=center|3
|align=center|5:00
|Fresno, California, United States
|
|-
|Win
|align=center|7–2
|Raufeon Stots
|KO (spinning backfist)
|Ring of Combat 59
|
|align=center|1
|align=center|0:15
|Atlantic City, New Jersey, United States
|
|-
|Win
|align=center|6–2
|Sukhrob Aydarbekov
|Submission (armbar)
|Ring of Combat 58
|
|align=center|2
|align=center|N/A
|Atlantic City, New Jersey, United States
|
|-
|Win
|align=center|5–2
|Tony Gravely
|Decision (split)
|Ring of Combat 57
|
|align=center|3
|align=center|5:00
|Atlantic City, New Jersey, United States
|
|-
|Win
|align=center|4–2
|Paul Grant
|Decision (unanimous)
|Ring of Combat 56
|
|align=center|3
|align=center|4:00
|Atlantic City, New Jersey, United States
|
|-
|Win
|align=center|3–2
|Matt Tullos
|Decision (unanimous)
|CES MMA 36
|
|align=center|3
|align=center|5:00
|Lincoln, Rhode Island, United States
|
|-
|Win
|align=center|2–2
|Geoffrey Then
|Decision (unanimous)
|CES MMA 34
|
|align=center|3
|align=center|5:00
|Mashantucket, Connecticut, United States
|
|-
|Loss
|align=center|1–2
|Ricky Bandejas
|Decision (unanimous)
|CFFC 43
|
|align=center|3
|align=center|5:00
|Atlantic City, New Jersey, United States
|
|-
|Win
|align=center|1–1
|Dennis Dombrow
|TKO (punches)
|Ring of Combat 49
|
|align=center|3
|align=center|0:50
|Atlantic City, New Jersey, United States
|
|-
|Loss
|align=center|0–1
|Darren Mima
|Decision (majority)
|Ring of Combat 47
|
|align=center|3
|align=center|4:00
|Atlantic City, New Jersey, United States
|
|-
|}

See also 
 List of current UFC fighters
 List of male mixed martial artists

References

External links
 
 

Living people
1991 births
Sportspeople from Tbilisi
Male judoka from Georgia (country)
Male mixed martial artists from Georgia (country)
Sambo practitioners from Georgia (country)
Bantamweight mixed martial artists
Ultimate Fighting Championship male fighters
Mixed martial artists utilizing sambo
Mixed martial artists utilizing judo